Toni Hudson (born November 9, 1960) is an American actress, who has appeared in films and on television. Her first role was in the daytime soap opera Capitol. Her best known part was in the 1985 film Just One of the Guys as Denise.

She has made guest appearances on TV shows like The Greatest American Hero, T.J. Hooker, Knight Rider, The A-Team, and The Love Boat.

Film

Television

References

External links 
 

American film actresses
American television actresses
American soap opera actresses
Living people
1960 births
21st-century American women